Haselbach may refer to:

Inhabited places
Haselbach, Bavaria, a municipality in the district of Straubing-Bogen in Bavaria, Germany
Haselbach, Thuringia, a municipality in the district Altenburger Land, in Thuringia, Germany
Haselbach bei Gurkfeld, a settlement on the Sava River in Slovenia
Leszczyniec, German name Haselbach, a village in Lower Silesian Voivodeship, Poland

Rivers
Haselbach (Günz), a tributary of the Günz, Bavaria, Germany
Haselbach (Kammel), a tributary of the Kammel, Bavaria, Germany
Haselbach (Fulda), a right tributary of the Fulda, Hesse, Germany
Hasel (Orb), other name Haselbach, a tributary of the Orb, Hesse, Germany 
Haselbach (Pulsnitz), a tributary of the Pulsnitz, Saxony, Germany
Haselbach (Schwarza), the uppermost course of the Schwarza, a tributary of the Hasel, Thuringia, Germany

Other uses
 (born 1942), Austrian politician